A beachside is the coastal area near a beach. It may also refer to:
Beachside Soccer Club, A youth soccer club in CT
Beachside FC, an association football club in Hobart, Australia
Beachside, Newfoundland and Labrador
Beachside State Recreation Site, a park in Oregon